Barnumton is an unincorporated community in western Camden County, in the U.S. state of Missouri.

The community is on Missouri Route 7 approximately six miles east of Climax Springs. The Osage River and Lake of the Ozarks are about four miles to the north.

History
A post office called Barnumton was established in 1867, and remained in operation until 1956. The community's name honors a Barnum family of settlers.

References

Unincorporated communities in Camden County, Missouri
Unincorporated communities in Missouri